Tyler Gillett is an American film director, cinematographer, writer, and producer. A co-creator of the filmmaking collective Radio Silence, Gillett co-directed, with Matt Bettinelli-Olpin, the horror films Devil's Due (2014), Ready or Not (2019) and Scream (2022). He was also featured in a popular 2020 episode of the podcast Reply All.

Early life and education 

Born and raised in Flagstaff, Arizona, Gillett earned dual BFAs in film production and studio art, photography, from the University of Arizona in 2004.

Film 

Gillett began his film career in the camera department on the Will Ferrell film Semi-Pro. After working as a camera loader, operator and then DP, he began directing short films with comedians from The Groundlings and Upright Citizens Brigade Theatre, and later directed, produced and edited the series Domesticating, Funny in Love and Books, for Fremantle Media.

Chad, Matt & Rob 

In 2009, Gillett began working with Matt Bettinelli-Olpin and Chad Villella as part of the collective Chad, Matt & Rob. Gillett co-directed, co-produced, co-wrote, co-edited and worked as cinematographer on three interactive adventure shorts – The Birthday Party, The Teleporter and The Treasure Hunt – as well as the found footage horror short Mountain Devil Prank Fails Horribly. The group became known for their signature style, which blended adventure, comedy, sci-fi and horror, and received nearly 100,000,000 views online.

Radio Silence

After the dissolution of Chad, Matt & Rob, Gillett formed Radio Silence with Bettinelli-Olpin, Villella and Justin Martinez. The group co-directed the "10/31/98" segment of the horror feature film V/H/S. V/H/S premiered at the 2012 Sundance Film Festival, where it was acquired by Magnolia Pictures, and released theatrically on October 5, 2012.

With Bettinelli-Olpin, Gillett directed Devil's Due, a 2014 horror feature film from Twentieth Century Fox and Davis Entertainment. Their film Southbound premiered at the 2015 Toronto International Film Festival and was released theatrically by the Orchard on February 5, 2016.

In 2019, Gillett co-directed the well-reviewed comedic thriller Ready or Not with Matt Bettinelli-Olpin for Fox Searchlight, starring Samara Weaving, Adam Brody, Andie MacDowell, and Mark O'Brien.

In March 2020, it was announced that Gillett would co-direct Scream, the fifth installment of the Scream franchise, alongside Matt Bettinelli-Olpin, with Kevin Williamson serving as executive producer. The film was released on January 14, 2022.

Reply All
Gillett appeared in a March 2020 episode of the podcast Reply All, "The Case of the Missing Hit", in which he asked the podcasts' hosts for help in identifying a song he had heard on mainstream radio in the 1990s, but of which there was barely any trace on the internet. In the episode, Reply All host P.J. Vogt goes to great lengths to try to identify the song, including interviewing a variety of music industry notables and hiring a group of musicians to record the song based on Gillett's recollection. The episode was both popular and critically acclaimed, with The Guardian calling it "perhaps the best-ever episode of any podcast".

Filmography (with Matt Bettinelli-Olpin)
Feature films
 Devil's Due (2014)
 Ready or Not (2019)
 Scream (2022)
 Scream VI (2023)

Short films

References

External links 
 
 

1982 births
21st-century American male writers
21st-century American screenwriters
American cinematographers
American film directors
American film producers
Living people
People from Flagstaff, Arizona
Screenwriters from Arizona
University of Arizona alumni